The 1994 NCAA Division I Men's Soccer Tournament was the 35th organized men's college soccer tournament by the National Collegiate Athletic Association, to determine the top college soccer team in the United States. The Virginia Cavaliers won their fifth national title, and fourth straight, by defeating the Indiana Hoosiers in the championship game, 1–0. For the first time, the top four teams from the regular season were seeded nationally for the tournament bracket. This was also the first tournament to see more than 100 goals scored during its entirety. The final match was played on December 11, 1994, in Davidson, North Carolina, at Richardson Stadium for the third straight year. All other matches were played at the home field of the higher seeded team.

National Seeds

Early rounds

Final

References

NCAA Division I Men's Soccer Tournament seasons
NCAA Division I Men's Soccer Tournament
NCAA Division I Men's Soccer Tournament
NCAA Division I Men's Soccer Tournament
NCAA Division I Men's Soccer Tournament